Trial by Fire: Live in Leningrad is the first live album by guitarist Yngwie Malmsteen, recorded over several dates in February 1989 in Saint Petersburg (formerly Leningrad), and released on 12 October 1989 through Polydor Records. The album reached #31 on the Swedish albums chart and #128 on the Billboard 200. A VHS video of the concert was released on 11 July 1991 through PolyGram, and a DVD edition was reissued in Japan on 12 December 2006 through Universal Music.

Track listing

Video release
Intro - Heaven Tonight	
Rising Force	
Liar	
Queen In Love	
Deja Vu	
You Don't Remember, I'll Never Forget	
Crystal Ball	
Far Beyond the Sun	
Dreaming (Tell Me)	
Fury	
Guitar Solo (Trilogy Suite Op. 5 / Spasebo Blues)	
Heaven Tonight	
Riot in the Dungeons	
Black Star	
Spanish Castle Magic	
End Titles (Heaven Tonight)

Personnel
Yngwie Malmsteen – lead vocals (track 11), guitar, bass pedals, background vocals, mixing, production
Joe Lynn Turner – lead vocals (except track 11), background vocals (track 11)
Jens Johansson – keyboard
Anders Johansson – drums
Barry Dunaway – bass, background vocals
Tony Platt – engineering
Mark Dearnley – mixing
Matthew Budd – mixing assistance
Howie Weinberg – mastering

Charts

References

External links
Trial By Fire / Live in Leningrad, 1989 at yngwiemalmsteen.com
In Review: Yngwie J. Malmsteen "Trial By Fire: Live In Leningrad" at Guitar Nine Records

Yngwie Malmsteen live albums
1989 live albums
Polydor Records live albums